In the 2010–11 season, the Aruban Division di Honor — the top-tier football league in Aruba — consisted of ten teams. The championship was won by RCA.

Teams

Regular stage

Table

Playoff stage

References

External links 
Division di Honor via AFF
Aruba National League via FIFA.com

Aruban Division di Honor seasons
Aruba
foot
foot